Kim In-ho (born 19 June 1970) is a South Korean modern pentathlete. He competed at the 1992 Summer Olympics.

References

1970 births
Living people
South Korean male modern pentathletes
Olympic modern pentathletes of South Korea
Modern pentathletes at the 1992 Summer Olympics